Melitaea parthenoides, the meadow fritillary, is a butterfly of the family Nymphalidae. Note that the common name meadow fritillary is also used for the North American species Boloria bellona.

Distribution
It is found in south-western Europe, more specifically on the Iberian Peninsula, south-western France, parts of the Italian Alps and southern and south-western Germany and a few regions of Switzerland.

Description 
The wingspan is 28–34 mm. Seitz-  M.parthenie Brk. (= parthenoides Kef.) (67a). Above very similar to athalia, especially in pattern, but the black markings much thinner, yellowish red the prevalent colour. While in aurelia and athalia the yellowish red spots may be said to be united to bands, parthenie has orange bands of almost even width and traversed
by thin black veins; the median band especially is very broad, the spots composing it being almost twice as long as wide, which is hardly ever the case in European athalia. The underside likewise resembles athalia in
pattern, but is brighter, more variegated, the black edges of the various bands being more prominent, the colours contrasting more distinctly.

Biology
In dry, favourable climates, adults are on wing in two generations, from May to June and from August to September. At high altitudes, there is one generation from June to July.
The larvae feed on Plantago species, mainly P. lanceolata.

References

External links

 lepiforum.eu
 "Melitaea Fabricius, 1807" at Markku Savela's Lepidoptera and Some Other Life Forms
 Fauna Europaea

Melitaea
Butterflies of Europe
Taxa named by Wilhelm Moritz Keferstein
Butterflies described in 1851